The 2015 Federated Auto Parts 400 was a NASCAR Sprint Cup Series race held on September 12, 2015, at Richmond Raceway in Richmond, Virginia. Contested over 400 laps on the three–quarter (1.2 km) short track, it was the 26th race of the 2015 NASCAR Sprint Cup Series season. Matt Kenseth won the race, his fourth of the season. Kyle Busch finished second. Joey Logano, Aric Almirola and Dale Earnhardt Jr. rounded out the top-five.

Logano won the pole for the race and led 25 laps on his way to a third–place finish. Kenseth led a race high of 352 laps on his way to winning the race. The race had 13 lead changes among four different drivers, as well as six caution flag periods for 47 laps.

This was the 35th career victory for Matt Kenseth, fourth of the season, second at Richmond International Raceway and 10th at the track for Joe Gibbs Racing. With the win, Kenseth moved into a tie with Kyle Busch and Jimmie Johnson for the points lead after the Chase reset. Despite being the winning manufacturer, Toyota left Richmond trailing Chevrolet by 54–points in the manufacturer standings.

The Federated Auto Parts 400 was carried by NBC Sports on the cable/satellite NBCSN network for the American television audience. The radio broadcast for the race was carried by the Motor Racing Network and Sirius XM NASCAR Radio.

Report

Background

Richmond International Raceway (RIR) is a 3/4-mile (1.2 km), D-shaped, asphalt race track located just outside Richmond, Virginia in Henrico County. It hosts the NASCAR Sprint Cup Series and Xfinity Series.  "America's Premier Short Track" formerly hosted a NASCAR Camping World Truck Series race, an IndyCar Series race, and two USAC sprint car races.

Kevin Harvick entered Richmond with a 42–point lead over Joey Logano. Dale Earnhardt Jr. entered 93 back. Brad Keselowski entered 111 back. Jimmie Johnson entered 131 back.

Chase-clinching scenarios
The following scenarios were in play for the 2015 Chase for the Sprint Cup.

Regardless of who wins
Jamie McMurray clinched by starting the race. Ryan Newman would clinch by finishing 31st or better, 32nd if he led at least one lap or 33rd if he led the most laps. Jeff Gordon would clinch by finishing 17th or better, 18th if he led at least one lap or 19th if he led the most laps. Paul Menard would clinch by finishing ninth or better, 10th if he led at least one lap or 11th if he led the most laps.

If there's a repeat winner
Jamie McMurray, Ryan Newman and Jeff Gordon would clinch regardless of finish. Paul Menard would clinch if he finished 38th or better, 39th if he led at least one lap or 40th if he led the most laps. Clint Bowyer would clinch if he finished 28th or better, 29th if he led at least one lap or 30th if he led the most laps.

Must win to clinch a spot
Greg Biffle, Kyle Larson, Austin Dillon, A. J. Allmendinger, Casey Mears, Danica Patrick, Tony Stewart, David Ragan, Sam Hornish Jr., Trevor Bayne, Ricky Stenhouse Jr. and Justin Allgaier had to win this race to clinch a spot in the Chase.

Entry list
The entry list for the Federated Auto Parts 400 was released on Monday, September 7 at 1:05 p.m. Eastern time. Forty-five cars were entered for the race. All but Michael McDowell in the No. 95 Leavine Family Racing Ford were entered for the previous week's race at Darlington. Josh Wise drove the No. 30 Chevrolet for The Motorsports Group. Jeffrey Earnhardt attempted to make his first Sprint Cup Series start in the No. 32 Go FAS Racing Ford. Brian Scott drove the No. 33 Hillman-Circle Sport LLC Chevrolet.

Practice

First practice

Final practice

Qualifying

It’d be great to end the regular season with the win here Saturday night and take that momentum into the Chase next week at Chicago.” “We’re the best on stickers,” Matt Kenseth said of his tires after qualifying second. “I just didn’t get the lap I wanted there at the end.” “We weren’t that great in qualifying trim so I didn’t know what to expect, but obviously we have a good car and we made some good adjustments on that qualifying run,” said David Ragan after qualifying fifth. “That’s a great qualifying spot and anytime you can start in the top-10 or top-five, that’s a great spot.” "This is a tough place," Jeff Gordon said after qualifying 23rd for his 46th and final career start at Richmond. "But we're better than that. I hate it for our 3M Chevrolet team that we're going to be starting there, because I know we're better than that." "Just real slow and out of the track," said Dale Earnhardt Jr. after qualifying 29th. "I don't know, man, we've struggled all year in qualifying and it doesn't look like it's getting any better." Jeffrey Earnhardt, grandson of Dale Earnhardt, qualified 42nd for his first career Sprint Cup Series start. "It's exciting, it's what we've been trying to do ever since I started racing - it was to be here and now I am," Earnhardt told Motorsport.com.

Qualifying results

Race

First half

Start
Under mostly cloudy evening Virginia skies, Joey Logano led the field to the green flag at 7:57 p.m. He shot ahead of Matt Kenseth to lead the first lap. By lap 14, Kenseth pulled to the rear of Logano and eventually passed him going into turn 1 to take the lead on lap 16. By lap 28, he caught up to the tail-end of the field and used lap traffic to increase his lead. The first caution of the race flew on lap 37 when Martin Truex Jr. slammed the wall in turn 1. To add insult to injury, he was tagged for speeding on pit road and was forced to restart from the tail-end of the field.

The race restarted on lap 47. After restarting in the outside lane, Logano led a lap before Kenseth retook the lead from him. After 30 laps, he pulled to a four-second lead over Brad Keselowski. Debris in turn 1 brought out the second caution on lap 97. Danica Patrick was tagged for speeding on pit road and Cole Whitt was tagged for an uncontrolled tire. Both were forced to restart the race from the rear.

Second quarter
The race restarted on lap 104. Logano used the momentum of riding the outside line to take the lead the next lap. Kenseth passed him on the outside to retake the lead on lap 110. The third caution flew when Michael Annett got hooked by Jeb Burton, bounced off Michael McDowell, slid down the track and slammed the inside wall on the backstretch. Logano opted not to pit under the caution and assumed the lead.

The race restarted on lap 126. A lap later, Denny Hamlin easily passed Logano for the lead. After five laps, the entire Joe Gibbs Racing team ran first, second, third, fourth and pulled away from the field. Kenseth ran down and passed Hamlin for the lead on lap 139. Debris brought out the fourth caution on lap 210.

Second half

Third quarter
The race restarted on lap 218. Kyle Busch dove underneath Kenseth to take the lead on the next lap. Kenseth passed him to retake the lead on lap 228. Debris on the backstretch brought out the fifth caution on lap 290. Under the caution, McDowell collided with one of the service trucks and tore off his entire rear bumper. “It was my mistake, obviously,” McDowell said. “I’m driving it, so I take full responsibility for it. But it definitely caught me off guard and it was a surprise. I didn’t know it was even sitting there. Obviously I’m thankful nobody got hurt, embarrassed for my team and it was my mistake driving. A lot happened at once. Everybody jumped on the brakes and I just didn’t have time to react.” Keselowski and Jamie McMurray were both tagged for speeding on pit road and restarted from the tail-end of the field.

Fourth quarter

The race restarted on lap 297. Logano shot ahead of Kenseth to take the lead. Kenseth drove by him the next lap to retake the lead. Debris on the backstretch brought out the sixth caution of the race with 26 laps to go.

The race restarted with 18 laps to go. Kenseth drove off to score the victory.

Post-race

Driver comments
“We were really superb in the long run, but we had to work for it pretty hard in the short run,” Kenseth said. “I was disappointed to see the last caution. I knew it was going to be tough, but we were able to get the jump and get out front.”

“It is tough,” a dejected Aric Almirola said after what actually turned out to be his best finish of the season in fourth. “This is what we race for. We race to win races. We race to run for a championship. This race team, we got to do it last year and we had an engine failure at Chicago and feel like we had a lot more to show in the Chase last year. We wanted another shot at it really bad. We have a really, really good race team and am disappointed we didn’t get Smithfield and Ford into the Chase again.”

“I wasn’t limited in the car at all,” Denny Hamlin said after finishing sixth with a torn right ACL. “You really don’t notice anything until you stop, and that’s the thing, feeling the throbbing, feeling my heart beat in my knee. I thought it (his knee) was good at first. I had it drained right before the race started, which helped a lot, getting a bunch of that blood out of there. After that, I felt pretty good. Obviously, any kind of heat brings swelling back. I’m sure it swelled again at the end of the race, and that’s why I’m as stiff as I am.”

“The car…..I was a little nervous, we were hovering around 21st, we made a slight adjustment and boom we started going to the front,” Jeff Gordon explained after finishing seventh.  “I don't know if we were a top‑five car, but we were definitely a top‑10 car and finished seventh.  Excited we finally had a solid night on pit road, on the racetrack, in the race car, communication.  Everything was just really solid. That certainly gives us something to be excited about these next ten races and these guys have been working so hard.  I know everybody works hard but they just haven't been getting the rewards of that hard work.  It's nice to be in the Chase and take that relief and take that breath and now go reset and see what we can do over the next 10. We're behind.  We know that.  Those guys are unbelievable. But there's a lot of ways to make it to Homestead and there's a lot that can happen and we're working as hard as anybody to try to see what we can do better, learn from our competitors, and try to catch up, but we're definitely playing catch‑up. I think Junior is probably the best in our stable right now and he proved that again tonight (fifth), but we work hard together to try to improve for each of us, and if we continue to do that, we'll make gains.  There was a lot of pressure in this final season to make that Chase, so I'm glad we got that done.”

"Obviously everybody knows all the news and the stories, but to be able to battle through that, I owe everybody in the organization a great deal of thanks for keeping their head down, to keep digging and get ourselves into the Chase," Clint Bowyer said after his 10th-place finish qualified him for the Chase. It's a big monumental thing for an organization to go through what we're going through. To get to the Chase is the best of the best, the elite in motorsports, and MWR is once again a part of it. I'm really proud of [crew chief] Billy Scott and everybody on the 5-Hour Energy Toyota."

"We ran about where we typically do here at Richmond, which is right around the top 10," Kyle Larson said after finishing 12th and missing the Chase. "I don't think anybody was beating Matt Kenseth tonight. He was super fast. Disappointing run for the Chase. I think everybody on our team thought the 42 would definitely be in the Chase to start the season after the way we ended last year. But it wasn't the case this season, so we'll work hard the last 10 races to try and run strong for Target and get them a win and work on being consistent. That's where we've struggled pretty much all year long was being consistent, so we'll try and work hard at that and try and finish strong."

“The main thing for me is just figuring out how to get a car to turn again. I struggled all year to have front turn. If I don’t have that I can’t race,” Kasey Kahne said after finishing 18th two laps down and missing the Chase. "That is how I’ve been my whole life – just work on trying to get the cars to turn the way I need them to. If we can’t, then we will keep running about 15th. I could take off alright on restarts. We could go for a little bit and then I would just get so tight with the front it wouldn’t turn. I was having a couple of other issues with brakes and stuff." We tried to fight through there. We got a lap down and then once we didn't get the (free pass) we ran in position for a while and we were too far back and ended up two laps down. Matt was really good. Those guys were fast.”

“It was a horrible race," Paul Menard said after finishing three laps down in 26th, "but we’re in the Chase. I guess I’m happy. We had such a bad race, but we can hit the reset button now and go to Chicago. Everybody’s got a shot. All it takes is one (bad) race for somebody, and it’s hard to make that up.”

Possible jumped restart

On the final restart with 18 laps to go, it appeared that race leader Matt Kenseth started accelerating before the restart zone (jumped the restart). Roger Penske, team owner of Team Penske, said sarcastically that someone in race control "must have closed the window and pulled the blind down. That's how bad it was. They talk about it in the drivers meeting and how they were going to do something. They docked [Ryan] Blaney the other night [three weeks prior in the Truck Series race at Bristol] for the same thing. I don't understand. It must be a different set of rules. They've got to come up with some way to say what's right or what's wrong. To me, this is a perfect example of inconsistencies. And when you are racing for as tight as we are for everything that's on the line, you just can't have that kind of officiating."

In his weekly Monday appearance on the Sirius XM NASCAR Radio program The Morning Drive, NASCAR Executive Vice–President and Chief Racing Development Officer Steve O'Donnell explained to Mike Bagley and Pete Pistone why NASCAR decided not to penalize Kenseth for jumping the restart and if NASCAR is content with continuing to leave control of the restart in the hands of the race leader.

Collision with service truck

During his appearance on The Morning Drive, O'Donnell also addressed Michael McDowell colliding with a service truck on the backstretch during the fifth caution of the race. He said that NASCAR had "conversations with the driver, spotter and the crew chief immediately following the race" and that they would "debrief with those folks [track safety and cleanup workers]...[,] see what they saw and look to not have that happen in the future."

Race results

Race statistics
13 lead changes among 4 different drivers
6 cautions for 47 laps
Time of race: 2 hours, 59 minute, 22 seconds
Average speed: 
Matt Kenseth took home $262,451 in winnings

Race awards
 Coors Light Pole Award: Joey Logano (21.349)
 3M Lap Leader: Matt Kenseth (352 laps)
 American Ethanol Green Flag Restart Award: Matt Kenseth
 Duralast Brakes "Bake In The Race" Award: Matt Kenseth
 Freescale "Wide Open": Joey Logano
 Ingersoll Rand Power Move: Brian Scott (5 positions)
 MAHLE Clevite Engine Builder of the Race: Toyota Racing Development, #20
 Mobil 1 Driver of the Race: Matt Kenseth (149.7 driver rating)
 Moog Steering and Suspension Problem Solver of The Race: Dale Earnhardt Jr. (crew chief Greg Ives (0.154 seconds))
 NASCAR Sprint Cup Leader Bonus: No winner: rolls over to $230,000 at next event
 Sherwin-Williams Fastest Lap: Matt Kenseth (Lap 3, 21.272)
 Sunoco Rookie of The Race: Brett Moffitt

Media

Television
NBCSN covered the race on the television side.  Rick Allen, 1998 race winner Jeff Burton and Steve Letarte had the call in the booth for the race. Dave Burns, Mike Massaro, Marty Snider and Kelli Stavast handled pit road on the television side.

Radio
MRN had the radio call for the race, which was simulcast on Sirius XM NASCAR Radio. Joe Moore, Jeff Striegle and six–time Richmond winner Rusty Wallace called the race from the booth when the field was racing down the front stretch. Dave Moody called the race from a scaffold inside the entrance to turn 3 when the field was racing down the backstretch. Alex Hayden, Winston Kelley and Steve Post worked pit road on the radio side.

Standings after the race

Drivers' Championship standings after Chase reset

Manufacturers' Championship standings

Note: Only the first sixteen positions are included for the driver standings.

References

VMI Keydets bask Virginia
Federated Auto Parts 400
NASCAR races at Richmond Raceway